Lior Eliyahu (born 9 September 1985) is an Israeli former professional basketball player. He is 2.06 m (6 ft 9 in) in height and he weighs 105 kg (225 pounds). He plays at the power forward position. He was named the 2012 and 2015 Israeli Basketball Premier League MVP.

Early life 
Eliyahu is Jewish, and was born in Ramat-Gan, Israel.

Professional career 
Eliyahu grew up in the youth system of Maccabi Ironi Ramat Gan, but moved to Galil for the 2004–05 season, in order to further his career. The move paid off when, under the guidance of Oded Katash, Eliyahu made great strides in improving his game. After the 2005–06 season, Eliyahu entered the 2006 NBA draft, a move criticized by Hanoch Mintz, Eliyahu's coach during his time in Ramat Gan.

In pre-draft camps in Europe, Eliyahu impressed along with fellow Israeli Yotam Halperin and when the camp was finished in Treviso, Italy, both had dramatically climbed the mock draft charts. He also impressed during matches between Maccabi Tel Aviv and NBA teams. During the EuroLeague 2006–07 season, Eliyahu averaged 10.8 points per game.

In December 2008, Eliyahu became the first Israeli to be named the EuroLeague MVP of the Month during the season. He recorded a double double in all three games he played during December. Overall for the 2008–09 EuroLeague season, Eliyahu averaged 14.0 points and 6.6 rebounds per game. In 2009, Eliyahu signed a 4-year contract worth €6 million euros net income with the Spanish League club Caja Laboral and he won the Spanish national championship with his new team in 2010, scoring 18 points in the deciding game against then EuroLeague champions Barcelona.

In September 2010, he returned to Maccabi Tel Aviv, signing a five-year contract. He was named the 2012 Israeli Basketball Premier League MVP.

In November 2013, he signed a three-year deal with Hapoel Jerusalem. In 2015, helped the club win its first-ever Israeli championship. He was named the 2015 Israeli Basketball Premier League MVP.

In 2017, Eliyahu took another championship with Hapoel Jerusalem. In January 2016, signed a three-year extension to his contract with Hapoel Jerusalem.

On 10 May 2018, Eliyahu recorded a career-high 15 assists, along with 10 points, 5 rebounds and 4 steals in a 92–73 win over Hapoel Eilat. He was subsequently named Israeli League Round 30 MVP.

On 23 August 2018, Eliyahu was named Hapoel Jerusalem's new team captain, replacing Yotam Halperin.

On 26 July 2019, Eliyahu signed with Maccabi Ashdod for the 2019–20 season, joining his former head coach Brad Greenberg. On 21 October 2019, Eliyahu recorded a season-high 22 points, shooting 10-of-15 from the field, along with seven rebounds and seven assists, leading Ashdod to an 83–76 win over Hapoel Tel Aviv. He was subsequently named Israeli League Round 3 MVP.

NBA draft rights 
On 28 June 2006, he made national headlines in Israel by being selected by the Orlando Magic with the 44th pick of the 2006 NBA draft. He was later traded to the Houston Rockets for cash considerations.

On 26 June 2012, the Minnesota Timberwolves traded the 18th overall pick of the 2012 NBA draft, to the Houston Rockets, in exchange for Chase Budinger and the draft rights to Eliyahu.

On 9 July 2019, his draft rights were traded to the Golden State Warriors in exchange for Treveon Graham and Shabazz Napier.

Israel national team 
Eliyahu was a member of the senior Israel national team at the 2007, 2009, 2011, 2013, 2015, and 2017 EuroBasket tournaments.

On 8 May 2018, Eliyahu announced his decision to retire from the Israel national team.

Awards and accomplishments 
FIBA Europe Under-20 Championship: All Tournament Team (2005)
EuroChallenge: All-Star (2006)

Career statistics

EuroLeague 

|-
| style="text-align:left;"| 2006–07
| style="text-align:left;" rowspan=3| Maccabi Tel Aviv
| 22 || 15 || 21.2 || .575 || .000 || .653 || 5.3 || 1.3 || .9 || .5 || 10.8 || 13.1
|-
| style="text-align:left;"| 2007–08
| 18 || 5 || 10.1 || .549 || .000 || .591 || 1.9 || 1.1 || .4 || .1 || 3.8 || 5.1
|-
| style="text-align:left;"| 2008–09
| 16 || 9 || 26.5 || .624 || .000 || .667 || 6.6 || 2.4 || .6 || .3 || 14.0 || 17.6
|-
| style="text-align:left;"| 2009–10
| style="text-align:left;"| Caja Laboral
| 15 || 4 || 18.4 || .632 || .000 || .400 || 3.4 || 1.3 || .7 || .3 || 8.4 || 11.1
|-
| style="text-align:left;"| 2010–11
| style="text-align:left;" rowspan=3| Maccabi Tel Aviv
| 21 || 21 || 20.3 || .601 || .200 || .739 || 3.8 || 1.0 || .8 || .5 || 10.9 || 11.8
|-
| style="text-align:left;"| 2011–12
| 20 || 15 || 18.2 || .566 || 1.000 || .542 || 3.0 || 1.0 || .3 || .1 || 8.5 || 8.1
|-
| style="text-align:left;"| 2012–13
| 23 || 10 || 17.2 || .483 || .000 || .800 || 3.1 || 2.1 || .7 || .2 || 7.3 || 8.2
|- class="sortbottom"
| style="text-align:left;"| Career
| style="text-align:left;"|
| 135 || 79 || 18.9 || .568 || .125 || .650 || 4.0 || 1.3 || .6 || .3 || 9.1 || 10.6

EuroCup 

|-
| style="text-align:left;"| 2013–14
| style="text-align:left;"| Hapoel Jerusalem B.C.
| 15 || 14 || 25.2 || .500 || .000 || .267 || 4.7 || 2.5 || .9 || .5 || 9.6 || 9.8
|-
| style="text-align:left;"| 2014–15
| style="text-align:left;"| Hapoel Jerusalem B.C.
| 10 || 10 || 25.0 || .515 || .000 || .533 || 3.2 || 2.1 || 1 || .4 || 10.8 || 9.2
|-
| style="text-align:left;"| 2015–16
| style="text-align:left;"| Hapoel Jerusalem B.C.
| 13 || 12 || 21.9 || .485 || .000 || .556 || 4.9 || 2.8 || .8 || .2 || 10.5 || 10.4
|-
| style="text-align:left;"| 2016–17
| style="text-align:left;"| Hapoel Jerusalem B.C.
| 19 || 6 || 15.5 || .513 || .000 || .545 || 3.5 || 1.9 || .6 || .2 || 6.9 || 7.8
|- class="sortbottom"
| style="text-align:left;"| Career
| style="text-align:left;"|
| 57 || 42 || 21.7 || .502 || 0.000 || .486 || 4.1 || 2.3 || .8 || .3 || 9.1 || 9.3

Domestic leagues

See also 
List of select Jewish basketball players

References

External links 

Lior Eliyahu at draftexpress.com
Lior Eliyahu at eurobasket.com
Lior Eliyahu at euroleague.net

1985 births
Living people
ABA League players
Israeli expatriate basketball people in Spain
Hapoel Galil Elyon players
Hapoel Jerusalem B.C. players
Israeli Basketball Premier League players
Israeli expatriate sportspeople in Spain
Israeli Jews
Israeli men's basketball players
Israeli people of Iranian-Jewish descent
Jewish men's basketball players
Liga ACB players
Maccabi Ashdod B.C. players
Maccabi Tel Aviv B.C. players
Orlando Magic draft picks
Sportspeople from Ramat Gan
Power forwards (basketball)
Saski Baskonia players
Small forwards